Blind Faith is a 1998 American made-for-television drama film directed by Ernest R. Dickerson. The movie stars Charles S. Dutton, Courtney B. Vance, Kadeem Hardison, Garland Whitt and Lonette McKee. It premiered in January 1998 on Showtime. The film's screenplay was nominated for an Independent Spirit Award, while Dutton received two nominations for awards, and Vance garnered one nomination. Set in the 1950s, during a murder trial, the film deals with themes of racism and homophobia.

Plot
Set in 1957, Charlie is 18, and both black and gay. He kills a young white man in a nearby park late at night. The white man, one of seven young white men, had ganged up and murdered his secret boyfriend David Mercer, during a hate crime. Charlie is arrested, and confesses to attempting to rob the white boy, and says his death was accidental. Charlie is purposefully concealing the truth so as not to expose his own homosexuality and shame his father. He is charged and put on trial, where the young white men lie and testify against him. During the trial, the circumstances of how it really happened are never revealed due to Charlie not wanting to displease his homophobic father, who is a police officer. The father is also in line for a promotion to become the first black sergeant, which in his mind, is more important than finding out what really happened to Charlie that night, although he secretly does know. Later, the truth is finally revealed, but it's too late, because Charlie is already sitting on death row waiting for the electric chair, having lost appeal after appeal. In the end, Charlie eventually hangs himself to make his father proud of him for being a man and keeping "the secret".

Cast
Charles S. Dutton as Charles Williams
Courtney B. Vance as John Williams
Kadeem Hardison as Eddie Williams
Lonette McKee as Carol Williams
Garland Whitt as Charles Williams Jr.
Karen Glave as Anna Huggins
Joel Gordon as David Mercer
Sandra Caldwell as Paulette Mercer
Aron Tager as Judge Aker
Shawn Lawrence as Prosecuting Attorney
Birdie M. Hale as Mrs. Barry
Peter MacNeill as Captain McCully
Jeff Clarke as Timothy

Critical reception
Dennis Harvey, film reviewer for Variety wrote that the "screenplay has some stretches of hackneyed dialogue", but "generally has narrative punch and passion to spare". He was generally satisfied with the acting, saying "Vance anchors the action, alternating convincing courtroom savvy with a desperate, bittersweet familial loyalty...and Hardison, Whitt and Karen Glave ably lead the supporting scroll". Harvey also mentions the "racism and homophobia" being played out in the 1950s murder trial, and highlights the brief prelude to the movie where an older Vance (Charlie's lawyer) is seen in 1989 watching in disgust as the white perpetrators in the racially motivated murder of Yusef Hawkins "get wrist-slap punishment".

Janet Maslin wrote in The New York Times that the movie was "directed with conviction and restraint" and Courtney B. Vance's performance was "first-rate". She also suggested that in the end Blind Faith is "a father-son tragedy, with a lesson to be learned". In another review for the Times, Bernard Weinraub called the film a "drama on racism", and "the story, by Frank Military, a former actor, deals not only with racism but also homophobia".

Nominations
Screen Actors Guild Award for Outstanding Performance by a Male Actor in a Miniseries or Television Movie (Charles Dutton, nominated) 
Independent Spirit Award for Best Supporting Male (Charles Dutton, nominated) 
Independent Spirit Award for Best Male Lead (Courtney B. Vance, nominated) 
Independent Spirit Award for Best Screenplay (nominated)

References

External links

1998 films
1998 independent films
African-American films
African-American LGBT-related films
American LGBT-related television films
Films directed by Ernest Dickerson
Films set in New York City
1990s American films